The ten-lined ctenotus (Ctenotus decaneurus)  is a species of skink found in Northern Territory and Western Australia.

References

decaneurus
Reptiles described in 1970
Taxa named by Glen Milton Storr